Ming-Kush is a village (urban-type settlement from 1953 until 2012) in the Jumgal District of Naryn Region of Kyrgyzstan. Its population was 3,647 in 2021. It is the site of a former uranium mine.

Population

References 

Populated places in Naryn Region